Engaeus martigener, the Furneaux burrowing crayfish, is a species of crayfish in the family Parastacidae, endemic to Australia.

References

Parastacidae
Endangered fauna of Australia
Freshwater crustaceans of Australia
Taxonomy articles created by Polbot
Crustaceans described in 1990